The College Hill Independent (commonly referred to as The Indy) is a weekly college newspaper published by students of Brown University and the Rhode Island School of Design, the two colleges in the College Hill neighborhood in Providence, Rhode Island. With a circulation of about 2,000, it is the largest weekly newspaper in Southern New England.

History
The Indy published its first issue on February 1, 1990, in which its beginning was described: “Our newspaper started in November when five students met at The Gate. All had been thinking about starting a new paper for some time."  The paper was decided to be “a workshop in putting together a newspaper for interested contributors, that it tie together trends that affect the Brown community, that it preview upcoming events as well as reviewing past events, and that it provide Brown students an opportunity to explore the environment outside their campus.” The founding editors decided that in accordance with their last goal, they would eventually inquire about including Rhode Island School of Design students on their staff, to which the Rhode Island School of Design agreed. The newspaper became a project publication of the two schools on College Hill, Brown University and Rhode Island School of Design with a single staff composed of students from both schools.

Today, The College Hill Independent is an alternative weekly newspaper written, designed, and illustrated by Brown University and Rhode Island School of Design students for the College Hill and greater Providence community. Ten issues are published per semester on a weekly basis. New issues come out Friday mornings and are distributed around Providence. The Indy is printed in Seekonk, MA by TCI Press. Indy alumni from the past ten years have gone on to work at The New Yorker, The Atlantic, The New York Times, The Nation, Vogue, Forbes, The Huffington Post, N+1, GQ, Wags Revue, Departures, The New Republic, The Village Voice, Bon Appétit, T Magazine,
New York Magazine, Paper (magazine),  BuzzFeed, Gawker, and National Journal, among others.

Sections

Although subject to change with each semester's influx of new editors, The Indy is currently organized into ten sections:

News  The News section is anchored by the recurring "Week in Review" page, where a few news stories from the past week are highlighted, often to comedic effect. The remaining pages in the section often feature original reporting on national or international issues outside of the Providence and Rhode Island areas.

Metro  The Metro section covers issues and news stories from the Providence and Rhode Island areas, be they about public art on College Hill or statewide economic issues, to cite a few recently published articles.

Features  Features serves as a catch-all for any and all in-depth articles that don't quite fit in the other sections. Often, this can include more literary nonfiction-style pieces, interviews, or articles covering larger trends in local and national issues.

Ephemera  Ephemera gives space for pieces integrating text and image, including poetry, photo, collage, and other formal experiments in visual storytelling.

Arts  The Arts section features reviews of current art and previews of local art events, conversations with prominent artists, and examinations of the culture at large. The section's style is often marked by an illustrative contrast between criticism of high- and low-brow art, rarefied and popular culture.

Literary  Poems, short stories, literary nonfiction, or even short plays all find room in the Indy Literary section.

Science and Technology  The Science and Technology section publishes articles on scientific research and technological developments. and innovation and larger trends within the sciences, but also devotes space to personal/expository hybrid pieces on science and essays examining the interactions between science and society.

Metabolics  This page has shifted between sports and food in recent years, with the two sections now dealing with 'the body'.

Occult  This page, highly experimental in form, is dedicated to philosophical and often strange topics.

List  This page features a rundown and critical analysis of events happening in the Providence metropolitan area, as well as the occasional conceptual poem.

Alumni
Notable alumni include:
David Rhode B'90, Pulitzer Prize–winning journalist 
David Levithan B'94, author of Boy Meets Boy and Nick and Norah's Infinite Playlist
MC Paul Barman B'96, rapper and producer of Paullelujah! and Thought Balloon Mushroom Cloud
Michael Bhatia B'99, social scientist and author of War and Intervention
Sasha Polakow-Suransky B'01, senior editor of Foreign Affairs and The New York Times
Jessica Grose B'04, author of Sad Desk Salad and co-author of LOVE, MOM: Poignant, Goofy, Brilliant Messages from Home
Sarah Kay B'11, poet
Dayna Tortorici B'11.5, senior editor at n+1
Grace Dunham B'14, actress and poet
Doreen St. Félix, B'14, staff writer at The New Yorker

External links
theindy.org
@theindy_tweets
The Indy on Facebook
Issuu

References

Brown University organizations
Publications established in 1990